Peter Browne ( – 27 August 1735) was an Irish Anglican priest and Bishop of Cork and Ross.

Life
Born in County Dublin, Browne entered Trinity College Dublin, in 1682, and after ten years' residence obtained a fellowship. In 1699 he was made Provost, and in the same year published his Letter in answer to a Book entitled "Christianity not Mysterious," which was recognized as the ablest reply yet written to Toland. It expounds in germ the whole of his later theory of analogy. Browne was a man of abstemious habits, charitable disposition, and impressive eloquence. In 1710 he was made bishop of Cork and Ross, which post he held till his death in 1735.

Works
In 1713 Browne became known for his vigorous pamphleteering attack on the fashion of drinking healths, especially "to the glorious and immortal memory." His two most important works are the Procedure, Extent, and Limits of the Human Understanding (1728), an able though sometimes captious critique of Locke's essay, and Things Divine and Supernatural conceived by Analogy with Things Natural and Human, more briefly referred to as the Divine Analogy (1733).

The doctrine of analogy was intended as a reply to the deistical conclusions that had been drawn from Locke's theory of knowledge. Browne holds that not only God's essence, but his attributes are inexpressible by our ideas, and can only be conceived analogically. This view was vigorously assailed as leading to atheism by Berkeley in his Alciphron (Dialogue iv.), and a great part of the Divine Analogy is occupied with a defence against that criticism. The bishop emphasizes the distinction between metaphor and analogy; though the conceived attributes are not thought. as they are in themselves, yet there is a reality corresponding in some way to our ideas of them.

His analogical arguments resemble those found in the Bampton Lectures of Dean Mansel.

References

Sources

External links

1665 births
1735 deaths
Bishops of Cork and Ross (Church of Ireland)
Irish religious writers
Christian clergy from Dublin (city)
Alumni of Trinity College Dublin
Fellows of Trinity College Dublin
Provosts of Trinity College Dublin
17th-century Irish clergy
18th-century Irish clergy